Rajar Kirty is an upcoming Bengali thriller drama film directed by Shankar Roy. The movie is scheduled to be released on 27 November 2020 under the banner of Kamala Film Production.

Plot
Raja, a ten years old school boy lives with his parents in a blended family. He is computer addicted. While surfing internet Raja enters into the dark web and knows that a terrorist attack will happen in Kolkata. He promptly informs to the police through mail but later when the investigation starts, he can not find the website link. It causes problems for his family.

cast
 Biplab Chatterjee as Ramesh Chandra Dutta
 Ananya Chatterjee
 Rajesh Sharma
 Abhishek Chatterjee
 Master Ankush as Raja
 Master Sayan

References

2020 films
Indian drama films
Bengali-language Indian films
2020s Bengali-language films
Techno-thriller films